The Man of Gold (Hungarian: Az aranyember) is a 1962 Hungarian historical film directed by Viktor Gertler and starring András Csorba, Ilona Béres and Ernő Szabó. It was based on the novel The Man with the Golden Touch by Mór Jókai, which has been adapted for the screen several times.

Cast

External links

1962 films
1960s historical films
Hungarian historical films
1960s Hungarian-language films
Films based on Hungarian novels
Films directed by Viktor Gertler